San Tomé is an oil company town, or camp, located about 8 miles northeast of the city of El Tigre, in the state of Anzoátegui in Venezuela. The town of San José de Guanipa, also called El Tigrito, lies between El Tigre and San Tomé. San Tomé was originally an American planned community built in the 1930s by and for the Mene Grande Oil Company, a subsidiary of Gulf Oil Corporation. Ownership of San Tomé was assumed by Petróleos de Venezuela, Sociedad Anónima (PDVSA) after the oil industry was nationalized in 1975.

Geography

San Tomé is located within the eastern Venezuelan Llanos. It is therefore situated on a flat, open, nearly barren plain; the area is often referred to as the "Mesa de Guanipa" (Table of Guanipa).

Campo Norte (North Camp) contains the regional headquarters of Petróleos de Venezuela, Sociedad Anónima (PDVSA), the country's state-owned oil and natural gas company. Homes for company staff are also in North Camp, which is also called Campo Meneven. Campo Sur (South Camp) is a recreational area and includes workers' residences.

San Tomé and surrounds are served by San Tomé Airport, formally Don Edmundo Barrios Airport, located just west of the camp. The airport connects the towns of El Tigre, El Tigrito, and San Tomé to the rest of the country. The San Tomé-Puerto la Cruz highway connects the town with Puerto la Cruz on the coast. The largest city to the south is Ciudad Bolivar on the Orinoco River.

Oil
The oil concessions for Gulf Oil Corporation in Anzoátegui State were obtained in 1925 from Addison H. McKay, a representative of Sun Oil Company. In the 1930s a large field of light crude oil was discovered near El Tigrito by the Mene Grande Oil Company (MGO), a subsidiary of Gulf. The oil discovery led to the founding of El Tigre in 1933. The Oficina No. 1 well, a wildcat well begun in 1933 and completed in 1937, established the highly productive Oficina Formation and caused El Tigre to become a boomtown. The name "Oficina" (Office) was derived from the telegraph office in El Tigrito, and the Greater Oficina Area comprises many oil fields over a large fraction of Anzoátegui State.

Until the oil discovery, the area had been sparsely populated. By 1940 a road and an oil pipeline had been constructed to connect El Tigre with Puerto La Cruz. An oil terminal had also been built by Mene Grande at Puerto la Cruz. By 1946, 512 wells had been drilled, and the region had produced 127 million barrels of oil. This production occurred during World War II, when Venezuela was a major supplier of this critical commodity to the United States. At the price of oil in 1946, this quantity of oil had a value . San Tomé was built near El Tigre as the main camp for Mene Grande, comprising residences, offices, and laboratories. San Tomé became the headquarters of Mene Grande Oil after 1940.

The region just south of San Tomé to the Orinoco River is the "Orinoco Belt", a reserve of heavy crude oil. The oil reserve is the largest in the world. Standard Oil of Venezuela and Mene Grande had explored the area just north of the Orinoco in the 1930s, and had discovered this heavy oil reserve. Early on the oil reserve was recognized to be gigantic, but its oil was so viscous and heavy that it was not commercially viable to produce it until the 1980s. For 40 years the name for the reserve was the "Tar Belt".

Hollis Hedberg, an American geologist and petroleum scientist, was a primary contributor to Mene Grande's discoveries around El Tigre, where he lived from 1937 to 1939. After 1939 until 1946 he was based in San Tomé, where he was in charge of all geological operations in eastern Venezuela for Mene Grande. Hedberg later served as the chief geologist of Gulf Oil Company and was a professor of geology at Princeton University.

Oil camp 

San Tomé was built as a service camp for Mene Grande in the late 1930s, with construction continuing through the 1950s. E.E. "Gene" Brossard, the MGO District Manager for Eastern Venezuela, founded the town. The contractor Gustavo A. San Roman constructed it. Henri Pittier, a Swiss botanist, engineer, and teacher supplied some of the trees for the town. North Camp was designed for the American staff and offices of MGO, while South Camp was designed for Venezuelan workers. Since North Camp was an industrial site within barbed wire fencing for security, a constricted atmosphere was created, and the residents of the camp were sometimes nicknamed "Santomaniacs". An Industrial Hospital is located in San Tomé, the golf course Campo de Golf San Tomé is located just north of the town, and an elementary school is available for employee children. For many years the principal landmark of the town was its red and white water tower.

In addition to Hedberg, other notable San Tomé residents have included Jaime Lusinchi who was a medical doctor at the hospital around 1949 and who became president of Venezuela (1984-1989), Juan Chacín Guzmán who became President of Petroleos de Venezuela, and Edward B. Walker III who became the president and chief operating officer for Gulf Oil Corporation. Gene Brossard's daughter, Emma Brossard, was a San Tomé resident, attending primary school there after 1940, then returning after college graduation in 1950 to work for MGO and raise her family. She wrote her undergraduate dissertation on The Mene Grande Oil Company of Venezuela. E. Brossard became a noted petroleum historian and industry expert, particularly on the Venezuelan oil industry. In 1946 there were 800 residents at San Tomé, while in 1955 about 300 Americans and others worked at San Tomé.

After Venezuela nationalized the oil industry in 1975, PDVSA assumed ownership of San Tomé. The town was a thriving business center because of PDVSA. On 18 September 2006 Venezuela's President Hugo Chávez and Iran's President Mahmoud Ahmadinejad inaugurated a joint oil drilling operation with PDVSA and Iran's Petropars in San Tomé.

By 2018 the political and economic troubles facing Venezuela had engulfed the El Tigre-San Tomé region. Oil workers fled the state-owned oil company when their salaries could not keep up with hyperinflation, reducing families to starvation. Workers and criminals stripped vital oil industry equipment of anything of valuable, ranging from pickup trucks to the copper wire of critical oil production components. Oil facilities were neglected and unprotected, leading to diminishing oil production and environmental damage. Emma Brossard commented in 2005, "Venezuelan oil fields had a depletion rate of 25 per cent annually [and] there had to be an investment of US$3.4 billion a year to keep up its production." “But since Chavez has become president there has been no investment.”

UNEFA in Anzoátegui State 
The Anzoátegui campus of "La Universidad Nacional Experimental Politécnica de la Fuerza Armada Bolivariana" (The National Experimental Polytechnical University of the Bolivarian Armed Forces) (UNEFA) is located at San Tomé. The campus, one of 61 of the national system and which is located just south of South Camp, offers a free education in a variety of career options. Founded in 2002, UNEFA Anzoátegui has a student body of 1500 students.

Transportation 
San Tomé is served by two airports:
 San Tomé Airport 
 El Tigre Airport

See also 
 Carabobo Field
 Anaco, Venezuela
 Chimire, Venezuela

Bibliography 
 H.D. Hedberg, L.C. Sass, H.J. Funkhouser (1947). Oil Fields of Greater Oficina Area Central Anzoategui, Venezuela. AAPG Bulletin. 31 (12): 2089–2169.
 E.B. Brossard (1993). Petroleum research and Venezuela's INTEVEP: The Clash of the Giants. PennWell Books/INTEVEP, 211 pp. .

References

External links 
 Early history of San Tomé on ex-patriots website www.santome.org by archive.org (access date 15 June 2019).
 San Tomé Overflight YouTube video of a helicopter overflight of San Tomé obtained by Jake Howland in the late 1950s.
 The Venezuela Oil Patch YouTube video of oil field operations and the start of a new oil well near San Tomé by Jake Howland in the late 1950s.
 OpenStreetMap - San Tomé/El Tigre
 Google Maps - San Tomé
 UNEFA Website

Populated places in Anzoátegui